Alan Neil Bloch (born April 12, 1932) is a senior United States district judge of the United States District Court for the Western District of Pennsylvania.

Education and career

Born in Pittsburgh, Pennsylvania, Bloch received a Bachelor of Science degree from the University of Pennsylvania in 1953 and, after serving as a lieutenant in the United States Army from 1953 to 1955, received a Juris Doctor from the University of Pittsburgh School of Law in 1958. He was in the Pennsylvania Army National Guard from 1955 to 1959, and in the United States Air Force Reserve from 1959 to 1963. He was in private practice in Pittsburgh from 1958 to 1979.

Federal judicial service

On August 3, 1979, Bloch was nominated by President Jimmy Carter to a seat on the United States District Court for the Western District of Pennsylvania vacated by Judge Herbert Peter Sorg. Bloch was confirmed by the United States Senate on October 31, 1979, and received his commission on November 2, 1979. He assumed senior status on April 12, 1997.

See also
 List of Jewish American jurists

References

Sources
 

1932 births
Living people
Judges of the United States District Court for the Western District of Pennsylvania
United States district court judges appointed by Jimmy Carter
20th-century American judges
United States Army officers
University of Pennsylvania Law School alumni
United States Air Force reservists
Pennsylvania lawyers
21st-century American judges